Acraea acuta is a butterfly in the family Nymphalidae. It is found in Tanzania, Malawi and Zambia.

Subspecies
Acraea acuta acuta (Tanzania, Malawi, Zambia)
Acraea acuta ngorongoro Kielland, 1990 (northern Tanzania)
Acraea acuta nigromaculata Kielland, 1990 (north-eastern Tanzania)
Acraea acuta rubrobasalis Kielland, 1990 (north-eastern Tanzania)

Taxonomy
It is a member of the Acraea jodutta  species group-   but see also Pierre & Bernaud, 2014

Biology
The habitat consists of montane forests and mountain summits with evergreen shrubs. The larvae probably feed on Urera species.

References

External links

 Acraea acuta Le Site des Acraea de Dominique Bernaud
 Acraea acuta  Image collection Dominique Bernaud
Images representing Acraea acuta at Bold

Butterflies described in 1969
acuta